Mark Dingemanse (Middelburg, Zeeland, the Netherlands, 1983) is a Dutch linguist and an Africanist. He is an Associate Professor in Language and Communication at the Centre for Language Studies of Radboud University Nijmegen. Dingemanse obtained a MA degree in African Languages and Cultures at Leiden University in 2006, and a PhD degree in arts in 2011 at Radboud University Nijmegen. He is also a Senior Investigator in the Multimodal Language and Cognition research group at the Nijmegen Max Planck Institute for Psycholinguistics. Dingemanse performed linguistic fieldwork in eastern Ghana and did comparative research on various languages. He is principal investigator of the research programme Elementary Particles of Conversation, on the small words in everyday language. The Royal Netherlands Academy of Arts and Sciences awarded Dingemans a Heineken Young Scientists Award in 2020.

Publications
Dingemanse published many scholarly papers, including: 
 The body in Yoruba : a linguistic study, MA Thesis, Leiden University, [Leiden], 2006.
 The meaning and use of ideophones in Siwu, PhD thesis, Radboud University Nijmegen, 24 October 2011.
 with Majid, Asifa: The semantic structure of sensory vocabulary in an African language, in Proceedings of the Annual Meeting of the Cognitive Science Society Vol. 34 (CogSci2012), eScholarship, University of California, 2012, pp. 300–306.
 with Francisco Torreira, and N. J. Enfield: Is "Huh?" a Universal Word? Conversational Infrastructure and the Convergent Evolution of Linguistic Items, PLOS One, 2013.
 with Liesenfeld, A.: From text to talk: Harnessing conversational corpora for humane and diversity-aware language technology, in Proceedings of the 60th Annual Meeting of the Association for Computational Linguistics (Volume 1: Long Papers), 5614–5633, 2022, doi: 10.18653/v1/2022.acl-long.385.
 with Heesen, R., et al.: Coordinating social action: A primer for the cross-species investigation of communicative repair, Philosophical Transactions of the Royal Society B: Biological Sciences, 377(1859), 2022. doi: 10.1098/rstb.2021.0110.

External links
 . Video by Huh?. Duration 20s.

References

1983 births
Dutch Africanists
Leiden University alumni
Linguists from the Netherlands
Linguists of Yoruba
Living people
People from Middelburg, Zeeland
Psycholinguists
Radboud University Nijmegen alumni
Academic staff of Radboud University Nijmegen